The 22635 / 36 Madgaon - Mangaluru Intercity Express is a Express express train belonging to Indian Railways Southern Railway zone that runs between  and  in India.

Coaches
The 22635 / 36 Mangalore Central - Madgaon Intercity Express has one AC Chair Car, four Non AC chair car, four general unreserved & two SLR (seating with luggage rake) coaches . It does not carry a pantry car coach.

As is customary with most train services in India, coach composition may be amended at the discretion of Indian Railways depending on demand.

Service

As the average speed of the train is above , as per railway rules, its fare includes a Superfast surcharge.

Routing

Traction
As the route is going to electrification, a  based WDM-3D diesel locomotive pulls the train to its destination.

References

External links
22635 Intercity Express at India Rail Info
22636 Intercity Express at India Rail Info

Intercity Express (Indian Railways) trains
Transport in Mangalore
Rail transport in Karnataka
Rail transport in Goa
Transport in Margao
Konkan Railway